The dubious conger (Bathycongrus dubius) is an eel in the family Congridae (conger/garden eels). It was described by Charles Marcus Breder Jr. in 1927, originally under the genus Pseudoxenomystax. It is a marine, deep water-dwelling eel which is known from the western Atlantic Ocean, including the United States, the Gulf of Mexico, Caribbean Sea, and the Guianas. It dwells at a depth range of 128–886 meters. Males can reach a maximum total length of  centimeters.

References

Bathycongrus
Fish described in 1927